The 2022 South Carolina House of Representatives elections were held on November 8, 2022, as part of the biennial United States elections. South Carolina voters elected state representatives in all 124 of the state's house districts. Republicans flipped eight seats held by Democrats, while Democrats flipped one seat held by a Republican; with their majority expanded by a net gain of seven seats, Republicans achieved a supermajority in the chamber.

Results summary
The 2022 election results are compared below to the 2020 election.

Retirements
In total, 13 representatives (two Democrats and 11 Republicans) retired, one of whom (a Republican) sought another office.

Democrats
District 25: Leola C. Robinson-Simpson retired.
District 95: Jerry Govan Jr. retired.

Republicans
District 8: Jonathon D. Hill retired.
District 27: Garry R. Smith retired.
District 30: Steve Moss retired.
District 44: Sandy McGarry retired.
District 46: Gary Simrill retired.
District 48: Bruce M. Bryant retired.
District 65: Jay Lucas retired.
District 85: Chip Huggins retired.
District 92: Joseph Daning retired.
District 106: Russell Fry retired to run for U.S. representative from South Carolina's 7th congressional district.
District 110: William S. Cogswell Jr. retired.

Resignations

Republicans
Two Republicans resigned before the end of their terms.

District 97: Mandy Kimmons resigned December 21, 2021, to focus on her legal practice.
District 18: Tommy Stringer resigned January 7, 2022, due to family and health concerns.

Incumbents defeated

In primary elections

Democrats
Two Democrats lost renomination.
District 70: Wendy Brawley lost renomination to fellow incumbent Jermaine Johnson in a redistricting race.
District 101: Cezar McKnight lost renomination to fellow incumbent Roger K. Kirby in a redistricting race.

Republicans
Six Republicans lost renomination.
District 6: W. Brian White lost renomination to April Cromer.
District 10: West Cox lost renomination to Thomas Beach.
District 36: Rita Allison lost renomination to Rob Harris.
District 40: Rick Martin lost renomination to Joe White.
District 52: Vic Dabney lost renomination to Ben Connell.
District 114: Lin Bennett lost renomination to Gary Brewer.

In general elections

Democrats
Five Democrats lost re-election to Republicans.
 District 12: J. Anne Parks lost election to Daniel Gibson.
 District 64: Kimberly Johnson lost election to Fawn Pedalino.
 District 116: Chardale Murray lost election to Matt Leber.
 District 117: Krystle Matthews lost election to Jordan Pace.
 District 122: Shedron D. Williams lost election to Bill Hager.

Republicans
One Republican lost re-election to a Democrat.
 District 75: Kirkman Finlay III lost election to Heather Bauer.

Closest races
Nine races were decided by 10% or lower.

Predictions

Special elections
There were two special elections in 2022 to the South Carolina House of Representatives which preceded the general election.

District 97 
This election took place on May 17, 2022.

District 18 
This election took place on May 24, 2022.

Results by district

District 1

District 2

District 3

District 4

District 5

District 6

District 7

District 8

District 9

District 10

District 11

District 12

District 13

District 14

District 15

District 16

District 17

District 18

District 19

District 20

District 21

District 22

District 23

District 24

District 25

District 26

District 27

District 28

District 29

District 30

District 31

District 32

District 33

District 34

District 35

District 36

District 37th

District 38

District 39

District 40

District 41

District 42

District 43

District 44

District 45

District 46

District 47

District 48

District 49

District 50

District 51

District 52

District 53

District 54

District 55

District 56

District 57

District 58

District 59

District 60

District 61

District 62

District 63

District 64

District 65

District 66

District 67

District 68

District 69

District 70

District 71

District 72

District 73

District 74

District 75

District 76

District 77

District 78

District 79

District 80

District 81

District 82

District 83

District 84

District 85

District 86

District 87

District 88

District 89

District 90

District 91

District 92

District 93

District 94

District 95

District 96

District 97

District 98

District 99

District 100

District 100

District 101

See also 

 2022 South Carolina elections

References

External links 

 
 
  (State affiliate of the U.S. League of Women Voters)
 
 This Week in South Carolina | Midterm Election Recap - South Carolina ETV

House
South Carolina House
South Carolina House of Representatives elections